Below is a list of pages that provide a list of landmarks in a particular area or on a particular topic.

Asia 
 Beijing, China

Europe 
 Istanbul
 Lithuania

North America

United States 

 Albuquerque, New Mexico
 Chicago, Illinois
 Denver, Colorado
 Kansas
 King County, Washington
 Las Vegas, Nevada
 Milwaukee, Wisconsin
 Mississippi
 Omaha, Nebraska
 Pittsburgh, Pennsylvania
 Puerto Rico
 Riverside, California
 San Francisco, California
 Seattle, Washington
 Stockton, California

Oceania 

 Perth, Western Australia